"Writing's on the Wall" is a song by English singer Sam Smith, written for the release of the 2015 James Bond film Spectre. The song was released as a digital download on 25 September 2015. The song was written by Smith and Jimmy Napes, and produced by the latter alongside Steve Fitzmaurice and Disclosure and released on 25 September 2015.

"Writing's on the Wall" received mixed reviews from critics, some comparing it unfavourably to previous Bond theme songs. The mixed reception to the song led to Shirley Bassey trending on Twitter on the day it was released. Despite this, the single became the first Bond movie theme to reach number one in the UK Singles Chart. It also reached the top 10 in a few other European countries, but unlike other James Bond film themes, it was not as successful outside Europe, only peaking at number 43 in Canada and Australia and number 71 on the Billboard Hot 100. Only the instrumental version of the song appeared on the film's official soundtrack album. The song won the Golden Globe Award for Best Original Song at the 73rd Golden Globe Awards and the Academy Award for Best Original Song at the 88th Academy Awards, making it the second consecutive Bond theme to win (after "Skyfall" by Adele in 2012).

Background and composition
"Writing's on the Wall" was co-written by Smith and Jimmy Napes in a single session: they wrote it in under half an hour and quickly recorded a demo. They were so pleased with Smith's vocal performance that they used it on the final release. On 8 September 2015, Sam Smith announced that they were singing the song for the James Bond film Spectre. They described performing the theme as "one of the highlights of my career". The English band Radiohead also composed a song for the film, "Spectre", which went unused.

The song is written in the key of F minor with a tempo of 66 beats per minute (Larghetto). Smith's vocals range from A
♭3 to D♭5. Smith said it was "horrible to sing" as the notes are "just so high".

Critical reception
"Writing's on the Wall" received a mixed response from critics. Alexis Petridis of The Guardian wrote that the song attempted to capture the mood of Adele's "Skyfall", but "doesn't feel anywhere near as striking[...] the chances of it joining the pantheon of Bond themes that anyone with even a passing interest in pop music can hum seem pretty slender". Lewis Corner of Digital Spy rated it 3 out of 5 stars. Neil McCormick of The Daily Telegraph called the song a "monster Bond ballad", stating, "(The song) is very, very slow and surprisingly restrained, at times floating by on resonant piano notes, the faintest brush stroke of orchestra, with all the focus on Smith's intense, tremulous vocal, rising with controlled pace and tension to an audacious chorus pay-off". Chris DeVille of Stereogum felt it was inferior to Radiohead's rejected song.

Commercial performance

In the United Kingdom, "Writing's on the Wall" became the first James Bond theme to reach number one, on the issue dated 8 October 2015. The previous highest-charting Bond themes were Adele's "Skyfall" and Duran Duran's "A View to a Kill", which both reached number two. It also became Smith's fifth UK number-one single within two years. The song spent a total of 16 consecutive weeks in the UK Singles Chart. In the United States, "Writing's on the Wall" debuted and peaked at number 71 on the Billboard Hot 100, compared to the previous Bond song, "Skyfall", which debuted at number 8 in October 2012. In Canada, the song debuted at and peaked number 43. In Australia, the song performed moderately, debuting at number 44, and later peaking at number 43, but in Ireland, the song was a much bigger hit, debuting and peaking at number 9. The song has also charted in several other European countries though to a far lesser degree than its predecessor.

Track listing

Credits and personnel
Recording and management
 Recorded at RAK Studios, Abbey Road Studios and The Pierce Rooms (London, England)
 Mixed at The Pierce Rooms (London, England)
 Mastered at Sterling Sound (New York City, New York)
 Cover photograph by Rankin
 Artwork and design by Studio Moross
 Published by Naughty Words Ltd. / Stellar Songs Ltd. / Sony/ATV Music Publishing / Salli Isaak Songs Limited / Universal Music Publishing Limited

Personnel

Sam Smith – vocals, songwriter
Jimmy Napes – producer, songwriter, piano
Steve Fitzmaurice – producer, mixing and recording, additional programming
Guy Lawrence – co-producer, additional programming
Howard Lawrence – co-producer, additional programming
 Steve Price – orchestra recording
 Simon Hale – orchestra arrangement and conducting
 Charles Wong – assistant recording engineer
 Mike Horner – assistant recording engineer
 Gordon Davidson – assistant recording engineer
 Matt Jones – assistant recording engineer
 Toby Hulbert – assistant recording engineer
 Charlie Paakkari – assistant recording engineer
 Isobel Griffiths – orchestra contractor
 Lucy Whalley – assistant orchestra contractor
 Everton Nelson – orchestra leader
 Tom Coyne – mastering
 Aya Merrill – mastering assistant

Charts and certifications

Weekly charts

Year-end charts

Certifications

Release history

See also
 Outline of James Bond

References

2015 singles
2010s ballads
2015 songs
Sam Smith (singer) songs
Songs from James Bond films
Number-one singles in Scotland
UK Singles Chart number-one singles
Songs written by Sam Smith (singer)
Songs written by Jimmy Napes
Capitol Records singles
Pop ballads
Best Original Song Academy Award-winning songs
Best Original Song Golden Globe winning songs